= Pichachen Pass =

Pass over the Andes Mountains

Paso Pichachén
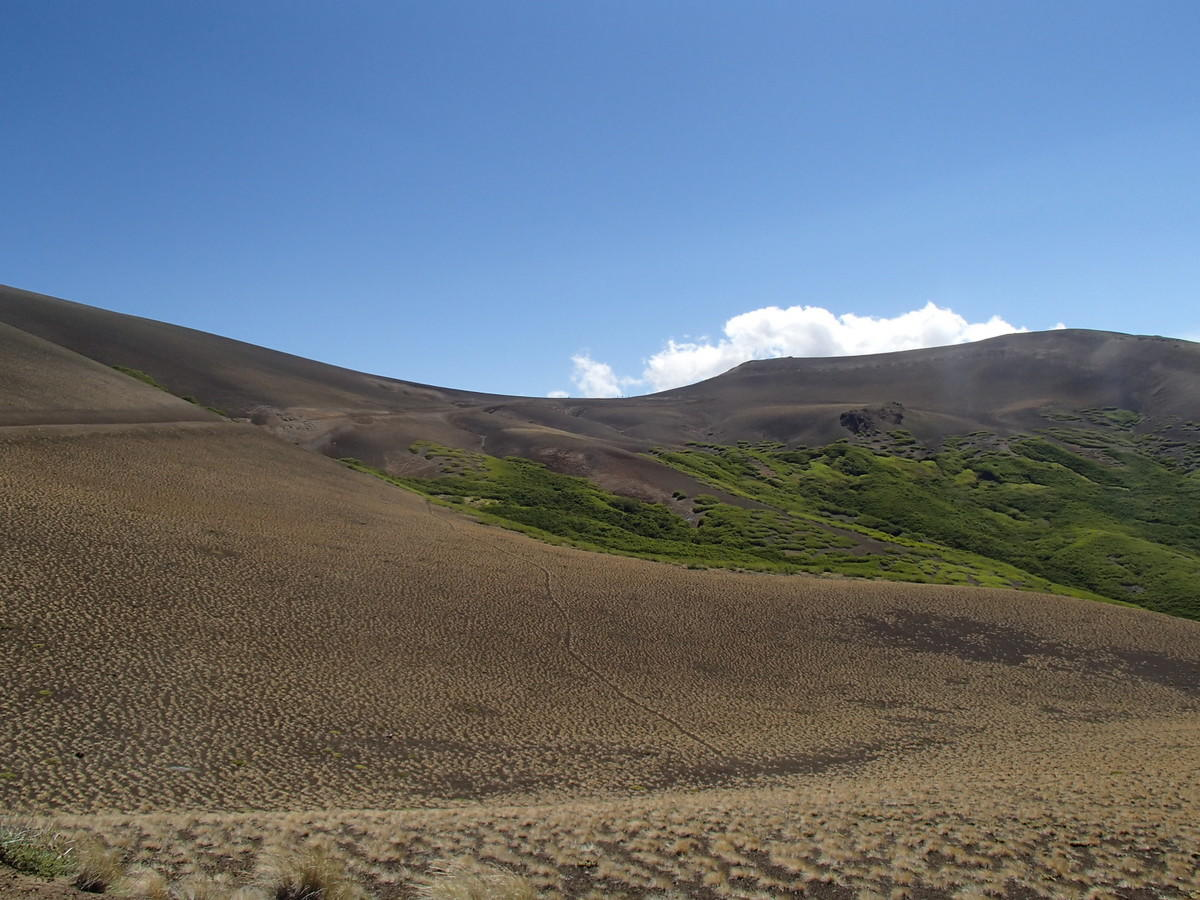
- The Argentine-Chilean border transects the top of the ridge.
- Interactive map of Paso Pichachén
- Elevation: 2,060 metres (6,760 ft)

Third Approach
- Location: Argentina–Chile border
- Range: Andes
- Coordinates: 37°27′16″S 71°08′10″W

The Pichachén Pass (Spanish: Paso Pichachén) is a pass over the Andes Mountains that connects Argentina and Chile. The border crossing between Argentina and Chile is at 2,060 m (6,760 ft) AMSL.

== See also ==
- Biobio Region, Chile
- Neuquén Province, Argentina

== Gallery ==
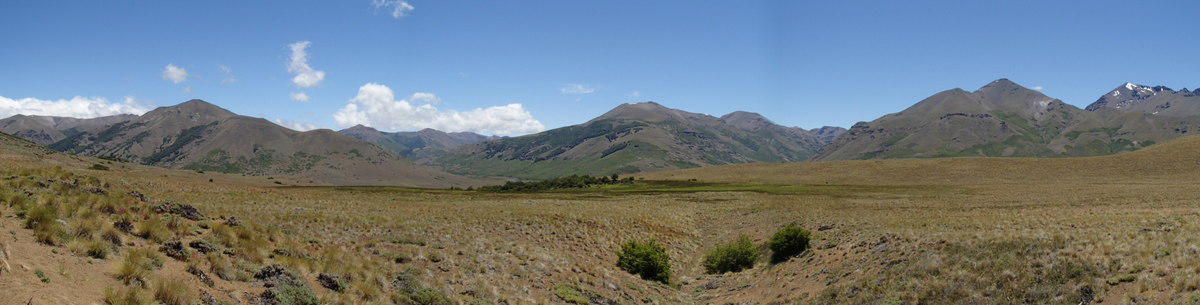
Paso Pichachén, Argentine side of the border.

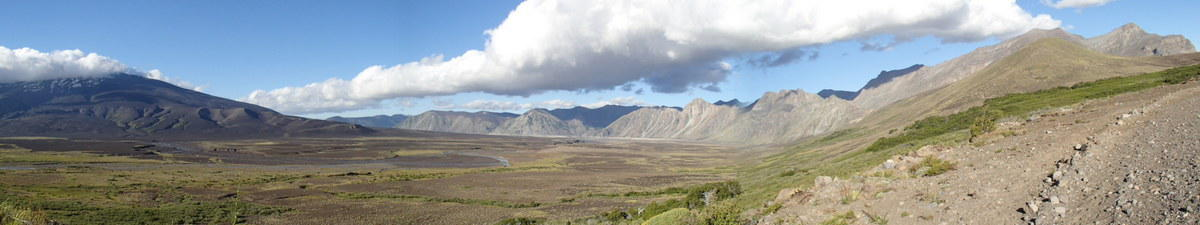
Paso Pichachén, Chilean side of the border.
